Robert Penn Warren (April 24, 1905 – September 15, 1989) was an American poet, novelist, and literary critic and was one of the founders of New Criticism. He was also a charter member of the Fellowship of Southern Writers. He founded the literary journal The Southern Review with Cleanth Brooks in 1935. He received the 1947 Pulitzer Prize for the Novel for All the King's Men (1946) and the Pulitzer Prize for Poetry in 1958 and 1979. He is the only person to have won Pulitzer Prizes for both fiction and poetry.

Early years
Warren was born in Guthrie, Kentucky, very near the Tennessee-Kentucky border, to Robert Warren and Anna Penn. Warren's mother's family had roots in Virginia, having given their name to the community of Penn's Store in Patrick County, Virginia, and she was a descendant of Revolutionary War soldier Colonel Abram Penn. 

In 1921 his left eye was removed as the result of an accident with his brother, which canceled his appointment to the U.S. Naval Academy. That summer, he published in "The Messkit" his first poem "Prophecy." After graduating from a private high school at age 15, his mother enrolled him in Clarksville High School in Clarksville, Tennessee for a year because she thought he was too young to go to college. In the fall of 1921, at age 16, he entered Vanderbilt University in Nashville, Tennessee, graduating in the summer of 1925 summa cum laude, Phi Beta Kappa, and Founder's Medalist. That fall, he entered the University of California, Berkeley, as a graduate student and teaching assistant, and upon receiving his M.A. in 1927, entered Yale University on a fellowship. In October 1928 he entered New College, Oxford, in England as a Rhodes Scholar and received his B.Litt. in the spring of 1930. He also received a Guggenheim Fellowship to study in Italy during the rule of Benito Mussolini. That same year he began his teaching career at Southwestern College (now Rhodes College) in Memphis, Tennessee.

Career
While still an undergraduate at Vanderbilt University, Warren became associated with the group of poets there known as the Fugitives, and somewhat later, during the early 1930s, Warren and some of the same writers formed a group known as the Southern Agrarians. He contributed "The Briar Patch" to the Agrarian manifesto I'll Take My Stand along with 11 other Southern writers and poets (including fellow Vanderbilt poet/critics John Crowe Ransom, Allen Tate, and Donald Davidson). In "The Briar Patch" the young Warren defends racial segregation, in line with  the political leanings of the Agrarian group, although Davidson deemed Warren's stances in the essay so progressive that he argued for excluding it from the collection. However, Warren recanted these views in an article on the civil rights movement, "Divided South Searches Its Soul", which appeared in the July 9, 1956 issue of Life magazine. A month later, Warren published an expanded version of the article as a small book titled Segregation: The Inner Conflict in the South.  He subsequently adopted a high profile as a supporter of racial integration. In 1965, he published Who Speaks for the Negro?, a collection of interviews with black civil rights leaders including Malcolm X and Martin Luther King Jr., thus further distinguishing his political leanings from the more conservative philosophies associated with fellow Agrarians such as Tate, Cleanth Brooks, and particularly Davidson. Warren's interviews with civil rights leaders are at the Louie B. Nunn Center for Oral History at the University of Kentucky.

Warren's best-known work is All the King's Men, a novel that won the Pulitzer Prize in 1947. Main character Willie Stark resembles Huey Pierce Long (1893–1935), the radical populist governor of Louisiana whom Warren was able to observe closely while teaching at Louisiana State University in Baton Rouge from 1933 to 1942. The 1949 film by the same name was highly successful, starring Broderick Crawford and winning the Academy Award for Best Picture in 1949. There was another film adaptation in 2006 featuring Sean Penn as Willie Stark. The opera Willie Stark by Carlisle Floyd, to his own libretto based on the novel, was first performed in 1981.

Warren served as the Consultant in Poetry to the Library of Congress, 1944–1945 (later termed Poet Laureate), and won two Pulitzer Prizes in poetry, in 1958 for Promises: Poems 1954–1956 and in 1979 for Now and Then. Promises also won the annual National Book Award for Poetry.

In 1974, the National Endowment for the Humanities selected him for the Jefferson Lecture, the U.S. federal government's highest honor for achievement in the humanities. Warren's lecture was entitled "Poetry and Democracy" (subsequently published under the title Democracy and Poetry).  In 1977, Warren was awarded the St. Louis Literary Award from the Saint Louis University Library Associates. In 1980, Warren was presented with the Presidential Medal of Freedom by President Jimmy Carter. In 1981, Warren was selected as a MacArthur Fellow and later was named as the first U.S. Poet Laureate Consultant in Poetry on February 26, 1986. In 1987, he was awarded the National Medal of Arts. Warren was an elected member of the American Academy of Arts and Sciences and the American Philosophical Society.

Warren was co-author, with Cleanth Brooks, of Understanding Poetry, an influential literature textbook. It was followed by other similarly co-authored textbooks, including  Understanding Fiction, which was praised by Southern Gothic and Roman Catholic writer Flannery O'Connor, and Modern Rhetoric, which adopted what can be called a New Critical perspective.

Personal life
His first marriage was to Emma Brescia. His second marriage was in 1952 to Eleanor Clark, with whom he had two children, Rosanna Phelps Warren (born 1953) and Gabriel Penn Warren (born 1955). During his tenure at Louisiana State University he resided at Twin Oaks (otherwise known as the Robert Penn Warren House) in Prairieville, Louisiana. He lived the latter part of his life in Fairfield, Connecticut, and Stratton, Vermont, where he died of complications from prostate cancer. He is buried at Stratton, Vermont, and, at his request, a memorial marker is situated in the Warren family gravesite in Guthrie, Kentucky.

Legacy
In April 2005, the United States Postal Service issued a commemorative stamp to mark the 100th anniversary of Warren's birth. Introduced at the post office in his native Guthrie, it depicts the author as he appeared in a 1948 photograph, with a background scene of a political rally designed to evoke the setting of All the King's Men. His son and daughter, Gabriel and Rosanna Warren, were in attendance.

Vanderbilt University houses the Robert Penn Warren Center for the Humanities, which is sponsored by the College of Arts and Science. It began its programs in January 1988, and in 1989 received a $480,000 Challenge Grant from the National Endowment for the Humanities. The center promotes "interdisciplinary research and study in the humanities, social sciences, and natural sciences."

The high school that Robert Penn Warren attended, Clarksville High School (Tennessee), was renovated into an apartment complex in 1982. The original name of the apartments was changed to The Penn Warren in 2010.

In 2014 Vanderbilt University opened the doors to Warren College, one of the first 2 residential colleges at the university, along with Moore College.

He was a Charter member of the Fellowship of Southern Writers.

Works

References

Further reading 
The South Carolina Review, vol. 38, no. 2 (Spring 2006) features 6 articles related to Robert Penn Warren, all available online (as of November 2014).

List of Presidential Medal of Freedom recipients -- Literature

Bibliography 
Millichap, Joseph R.. Robert Penn Warren after Audubon:The Work of Aging and the Quest for Transcendence in His Later Poetry. Baton Rouge, LA. :Louisiana State University Press, 2009 
Warren, Rosanna   "Places - A Memoir of Robert Penn Warren"  The Southern Review  Volume 41-2 Spring 2005

External links

Official website
The Robert Penn Warren Oral History Archive (digital exhibit, Louie B. Nunn Center for Oral History, University of Kentucky Libraries)
Robert Penn Warren bio at The Fellowship of Southern Writers
Robert Penn Warren page at poets.org
Robert Penn Warren page at KYLIT/Kentucky Literature
Robert Penn Warren Center for the Humanities at Vanderbilt University
Robert Penn Warren site run by tloufrey@charter.net
The Robert Penn Warren Civil Rights Oral History Project, Louie B. Nunn Center for Oral History, University of Kentucky Libraries
The Robert Penn Warren Oral History Project, Louie B. Nunn Center for Oral History, University of Kentucky Libraries

Timeline of Poets Laureate at the Library of Congress
Pulitzer Prize for Poetry
Guide to the Robert Penn Warren Photograph Collection at the University of Kentucky.
Guide to the Robert Penn Warren papers, 1916-1967 at the University of Kentucky.
Stuart Wright Collection: Robert Penn Warren Papers (#1169-014), East Carolina Manuscript Collection, J. Y. Joyner Library, East Carolina University
Stuart A. Rose Manuscript, Archives, and Rare Book Library, Emory University: Robert Penn Warren collection, 1964-1989
Robert Penn Warren Papers. Yale Collection of American Literature, Beinecke Rare Book and Manuscript Library
National Portrait Gallery Collection of Robert Penn Warren

1905 births
1989 deaths
20th-century American novelists
American literary critics
American male novelists
20th-century American poets
American Poets Laureate
American Rhodes Scholars
Deaths from prostate cancer
Formalist poets
Louisiana State University faculty
MacArthur Fellows
National Book Award winners
New Criticism
People from Guthrie, Kentucky
Pulitzer Prize for Poetry winners
Pulitzer Prize for the Novel winners
United States National Medal of Arts recipients
University of California, Berkeley alumni
University of Iowa faculty
Vanderbilt University alumni
Novelists from Kentucky
Novelists from Louisiana
Writers from Fairfield, Connecticut
Yale University faculty
Bollingen Prize recipients
Deaths from cancer in Vermont
Burials in Vermont
American male poets
Writers of American Southern literature
Presidential Medal of Freedom recipients
20th-century American male writers
Novelists from Connecticut
Novelists from Iowa
American male non-fiction writers
Robert Meltzer Award winners
Southern Agrarians
Members of the American Philosophical Society